Kristie may refer to:

Kristie Ahn (born 1992), American former professional tennis player
Kristie Boering (born 1963), Professor of Earth and Planetary Science at University of California, Berkeley, US
Kristie Boogert (born 1973), professional female tennis player from the Netherlands
Kristie Canegallo, Deputy White House Chief of Staff for Implementation for former US President Barack Obama
Kristie Ebi, American epidemiologist whose primary focus is the impact of global warming on human health
Kristie Fiegen, Republican politician from South Dakota, Vice Chairman of the South Dakota Public Utilities Commission
Kristie Fox (born 1985), American former collegiate All-American softball shortstop, head coach for UNLV Rebels softball team
Kristie Greene (born 1970), American beauty pageant titleholder named Miss South Carolina 1994
Kristie Jandric, Australian actress and model
Kristie Johnston (born 1980), Australian politician
Kristie Kenney, former senior U.S. diplomat, the 32nd Counselor of the United States Department of State
Kristie Kreuk or Kristin Kreuk (born 1982), Canadian actress
Kristie Macosko Krieger, American film producer
Kristie Macrakis (1958–2022), American historian of science, author, and professor at the Georgia Institute of Technology
Kristie Marano (born 1979), wrestler from Albany, New York
Kristie Marsden (born 1982), Canadian actress from British Columbia
Kristie Mewis (born 1991), American professional soccer player
Kristie Moore (born 1979), Canadian curler from Sexsmith, Alberta
Kristie Peterson (born 1955), ProRodeo Hall of Fame barrel racer
Kristie Phillips (born 1972), retired American elite gymnast
Kristie Puckett-Williams (born 1979), civil rights activist
Kristie Reeves, German actress, musical theater performer and producer
Kristie-Anne Ryder (born 1990), Australian judoka, half-lightweight category
Kristie Smith (born 1988), Australian professional golfer
Kristie Lu Stout (born 1974), American journalist and news anchor for CNN International

See also
Death of Kristie Fischer in Thornwood, New York
Kersti
Kirste
Kirsti
Kirsty
Kristi (disambiguation)
Kristy